Code Pink: Women for Peace (often stylized as CODEPINK) is a left-wing internationally active 501(c) organization that describes itself as a "grassroots peace and social justice movement working to end U.S.-funded wars and occupations, to challenge militarism globally and to redirect our resources into health care, education, green jobs and other life-affirming activities." In addition to its focus on what the group considers anti-war issues, it has taken action on issues such as drone strikes, the Guantanamo Bay detention camp, Palestinian statehood, the Iran nuclear deal, Saudi Arabia, and Women Cross DMZ. Code Pink representatives voiced support for Iran's developing missile technology as a defence against US military bases around Iran.

The organization characterizes itself as female-initiated. It has regional offices in Los Angeles, California and Washington, D.C., and many more chapters in the U.S. as well as several in other countries.

With members wearing the group's signature pink color, Code Pink has conducted marches, protests, and other actions in order to promote its goals. Although women initiated and lead the group, Code Pink encourages men to participate in its activities.

History

Code Pink was founded on November 17, 2002 by Americans activists including Jodie Evans and Medea Benjamin. The group's name is a play on the United States Department of Homeland Security's color-coded alert system in which, for example, Code Orange and Code Red signify the highest levels of danger.

In February 2003, shortly before the invasion of Iraq, Code Pink organized its first trip to that nation, and subsequently led five delegations there. These delegations included parents who had lost their children in Iraq, and parents of active soldiers. Additionally, they brought six Iraqi women on a tour of the United States, and published a report about how the U.S. occupation affected the status of Iraqi women.

On its website, Code Pink lists allegations of U.S. war crimes, and states that thousands of civilians were killed in Fallujah in 2004 due to the actions of the U.S. military. Along with other groups, they gave over $600,000 worth of humanitarian aid to refugees of Fallujah in 2004.

In 2014, Code Pink was awarded the US Peace Prize by the US Peace Memorial Foundation "In Recognition of Inspirational Antiwar Leadership and Creative Grassroots Activism."

Vigil at Walter Reed Army Medical Center
Code Pink participated in vigils at the Walter Reed Army Medical Center in Washington, D.C. to shed light on the plight of injured soldiers. Code Pink said that the purpose of the vigils was to highlight the lack of care for veterans and that the vigils have helped achieve improvements in that care.

Tucker Carlson interview
In 2006, Code Pink co-founder Medea Benjamin said that it was a myth that Venezuelan President Hugo Chávez had limited freedom of speech and eroded civil rights in Venezuela. In May 2007, Benjamin appeared as a guest on talk-show host Tucker Carlson's show, which was then part of MSNBC's schedule. Carlson criticised Benjamin for her statement and asked her: "Do you want to revise that given the news that Hugo Chávez has closed the last nationally broadcast opposition television station for criticizing him?" Benjamin replied that Chávez had not renewed the license of RCTV because the station "participated in a coup against a democratically elected government, his [Chavez's] government." Benjamin also said "Peru recently did not renew a license. Uruguay didn't renew a license. Why do you hold Venezuela to a different standard?"

Carlson responded that a 360-page Venezuelan government-published book accused RCTV of showing lack of respect for authorities and institutions. Carlson asked Benjamin, "I would think, as a self-described liberal, you would stand up for the right of people to 'challenge authorities and institutions.' And yet you are apologizing for the squelching of minority views. Why could that be?" Benjamin replied, "They [RCTV] falsified information. They got people out on the street. They falsified footage that showed pro-Chavez supporters killing people, which did not happen. They refuse to cover any of the pro-Chavez demonstrations."

Ground the Drones
In the summer of 2009, Code Pink began their "Ground the Drones" campaign. This campaign was a response to the Obama administration's continued and increased use of unmanned drones in the "war on terror," specifically in regions surrounding Pakistan and Afghanistan. Code Pink said that many of the drone strikes intended to target terrorist leaders and strongholds often miss their targets, causing the unnecessary deaths of innocent civilians.

"Ground the Drones" was fashioned as a form of non-violent, civil disobedience, similar to protests earlier that spring, by groups such as Voices for Creative Non Violence. Code Pink targeted Creech Air Force Base in Indian Springs, Nevada, claiming it was the "epicenter" for controlling drone activity. The goal of the protest was "halting unmanned aircraft strikes controlled via satellite links from Creech and other bases." The group continued protesting at Creech AFB through November and December 2009. Code Pink returned to Creech AFB in October 2011, along with other protest groups, to mark the 10th anniversary of the occupation of Afghanistan. Protesters dubbed it the "largest anti-war demonstration ever at Creech Air Force Base.

Gaza activities
Code Pink has organized more than seven delegations to Gaza, some of them at the invitation of the United Nations. 

Code Pink was criticised by Joshua Block, president and CEO of the Israel Project, for arranging a peace delegation to Iran in January 2019. 

Prior to the Gaza Freedom March, Code Pink endorsed the “Cairo Declaration to End Israeli Apartheid", which calls for comprehensive boycott of Israel. During the march, Code Pink co-founder Medea Benjamin coordinated the organization's stay with Hamas. Members resided in the Commodore, a Hamas-owned hotel in Gaza City. Hamas security officials accompanied activists as they visited Palestinian homes and Gaza-based NGOs. Prior to the march, Benjamin said the Hamas government had "pledged to ensure our safety." However, Code Pink leaders claimed Hamas had hijacked the initiative from the onset after imposing prohibitions on the organization's movements around Gaza. Amira Hass referred to the event as "an opportunity for Hamas cabinet ministers to get decent media coverage in the company of Western demonstrators."

Code Pink helped to organize an International Women's Day Delegation to Gaza in March 2014. Upon arrival at the Cairo airport on March 3, 2014, Benjamin was detained and assaulted by Egyptian authorities. She was deported to Turkey after the authorities had dislocated her shoulder. Other members of the international delegation, including American, French, Belgian, and British citizens, who arrived the next day were also deported. Some members made it into Cairo, although no one from the delegation made it to Gaza.

Syrian Civil War and Islamic State 
About ten activists of Code Pink demonstrated in U.S. Congress against military attacks in retaliation for Syria's suspected use of chemical weapons against its own people.

Code Pink activists demonstrated in Capitol Hill against the American intervention in Syria and Iraq to stop ISIS.

Arrests during Senate hearing 
Code Pink protesters showed up at the Senate Arms Services hearing to heckle Henry Kissinger and called him and chairman Senator John McCain war criminals. Senator McCain restored order and called for the Sergeant at Arms and the Capital Hill Police to escort Code Pink out of the building and called after them "Get out of here you lowlife scum!" 

Code Pink member Desiree Fairooz was arrested for laughing after a description of Senator Jeff Sessions by Alabama U.S. Senator Richard Shelby of the nominee as having a history of his "treating all Americans equally under the law is clear and well-documented," during the January 2017 confirmation hearing as United States Attorney General. After she had been convicted at trial, that verdict was reversed by the chief District Court Judge Robert Morin. The judge said Fairooz should not have been tried for laughing, only for speaking out as she was being removed, and called a mistrial. Instead of dismissing the case, Morin set her retrial for September. Fairooz faced up to a year in prison and $2,000 in fines for disruptive and disorderly conduct and obstructing and impeding passage on US Capitol grounds. On November 6, 2017, District of Columbia U.S. Attorney Jessie K. Liu filed a notice of nolle prosequi in the case against Desiree Fairooz. Upon the decision, Code Pink released a statement calling the 3 trials a waste of time and tens of thousands of taxpayer dollars, adding, "These sentences are designed to discourage dissent and prevent activists from engaging in the daily protests that are taking place during a tumultuous time." From the January 20 protests of the inauguration of Donald Trump, the United States Department of Justice is prosecuting 200 people on multiple felony charges.

Support for Iranian weapons programs
In March 2019 while visiting Iran, Code Pink representatives voiced support for Iran's developing missile technology, saying that "since the US has military bases around Iran, it is Iran’s right to upgrade its defense capability".

Occupation of the Venezuelan embassy in Washington, D.C.
During the 2019 Venezuelan presidential crisis, the US Government broke relations with the Nicolás Maduro administration and recognized Juan Guaidó as the acting president of Venezuela. On 10 April 2019, after the Maduro administration retired his diplomats from the Venezuelan embassy in Washington, US activists from Code Pink received keycards from the diplomats, moved into the building, and secured all entrances with chains and locks as Carlos Vecchio, Guaidó's ambassador appointed to the US, tried to gain access to the building. The US government considers the embassy as property of Guaidó's interim government. Clashes in May 2019 between US activists and pro-Guaidó Venezuelan demonstrators resulted in arrests on both sides. US authorities issued an eviction notice on the group on May 14. The last four activists were removed from the embassy by agents from the US State Department's Diplomatic Security Service and the US Secret Service on May 16.

At the end of July 2019, some members of Code Pink that occupied the embassy visited Venezuela during the Foro de São Paulo. Maduro posed for pictures with the group and rewarded them with gifts, including a book on Simón Bolívar and a replica of Bolivar's sword.

Later in 2021 Code Pink started collecting signatures to ask for the release of Colombian businessman Alex Saab, arrested and charged by the Justice Department with eight counts of money laundering, accused of moving $350 million out of Venezuela into accounts controlled in the United States.

National day of action to withdraw US troops from Iraq
Following the January 2020 assassination of Qasem Soleimani, leader of Iran's Quds Force, and of Abu Mahdi al-Muhandis, leader of Iraq's Popular Mobilization Forces by a US drone attack at Baghdad airport, Code Pink together with a number of other civil society groups called for a "national day of action" in 30 large US cities to request the withdrawal of US troops from Iraq. Thousands marched in over 80 cities across the country to protest against a possible war against Iran.

Russian invasion of Ukraine 
During the Russo-Ukrainian War, Code Pink criticized the United States for sending military arms to Ukraine to help it defend itself against Russia's invasion.

China 
In February 2023, two Code Pink protesters attempted to disrupt the inaugural hearing of a House select committee on the Chinese Communist Party, by holding up a sign stating, “China is not our enemy,” and shouting. Michael Rubin, a senior fellow at the American Enterprise Institute, has said Code Pink has amplified Chinese propaganda regarding repression of Muslim Uyghurs in western China.

See also

References

External links

 

2002 establishments in the United States
Anti–Iraq War groups
Civil disobedience
Direct action
Left-wing politics
Organizations established in 2002
Peace organizations based in the United States
Progressive International